A summa is a text that sums up knowledge in a field, such as:
 Summa Theologica and Summa contra Gentiles, the most famous works of Thomas Aquinas.

Summa may also refer to:

Places and jurisdictions
 Summa, Iran, a village in East Azerbaijan Province, Iran
 Samma, Jordan, old name for this Jordanian village
 Summa, Numidia, a former city and bishopric in the Roman province of Numidia, now a Latin Catholic titular see

Other
 Summa (genre)
 Summa (Pärt), a 1978 composition by Arvo Pärt
 Summa Corporation, a defunct American company
 Summa Health System, one of the largest organized delivery systems in Ohio
 1928 Summa, a main-belt asteroid
 Battle of Summa, a 1939–1940 battle fought between the Soviet Union and Finland
 Homer Summa (1898–1966), an American baseball player
 Scalable Universal Matrix Multiplication Algorithm; see Cannon's algorithm

See also 
 Somma (disambiguation)
 Summa potestas (law)